Kansas's 24th Senate district is one of 40 districts in the Kansas Senate. It has been represented by Republican former State Representative J. R. Claeys.

Geography
District 24 is based in the city of Salina, also covering Abilene, Solomon, Chapman, and other smaller communities in Saline County and some of Dickinson County.

The district is located entirely within Kansas's 1st congressional district, and overlaps with the 69th, 70th, 71st, and 108th districts of the Kansas House of Representatives.

Recent election results

2020

2016

2012

Federal and statewide results in District 24

References

24
Dickinson County, Kansas
Saline County, Kansas